Thomas or Tom Ryder may refer to:

Thomas Philander Ryder (1836–1887), American musician
Tom Ryder (rugby union) (born 1985), rugby union player
Tom Ryder (baseball) (1863–1935), baseball outfielder
Thomas Ryder (actor) (1735–1790), British actor and theatre manager
Thomas Ryder (engraver) (1746–1810), English engraver
Thomas Ryder (MP), British Member of Parliament for Tiverton borough, 1755-6
Thomas O. Ryder (born 1944), American businessman and executive
Tom Ryder (politician) (born 1949), American lawyer and politician in Illinois

See also
Thomas Rider (disambiguation)